William Kiernan Haywood (born April 21, 1937) is an American former pitcher, coach, manager and farm system official in professional baseball. He was also a college baseball head coach.

Career
After serving in the United States Marine Corps, Haywood enrolled in college at the relatively old age of 23, attending the University of North Carolina at Wilmington and the University of North Carolina at Chapel Hill.  Signing his first pro contract at age 27, he played his entire professional career for the Washington Senators' organization and appeared in 14 Major League Baseball games for the 1968 Senators, for whom he worked in 23 innings, allowed 27 hits and 12 bases on balls, registered ten strikeouts, and had an earned run average of 4.70. As a minor leaguer, he compiled a win–loss record of 47–37 with an earned run average of 3.03 in 165 games.

In 1969 he became the head baseball coach of Western Carolina University and later held the same position at Georgia Southwestern State University. He also served in professional baseball as a minor league coach and manager for the Senators/Texas Rangers franchise and as field coordinator and assistant player development director for the Seattle Mariners.

References

External links

1937 births
Living people
American expatriates in Panama
Baseball players from North Carolina
Burlington Senators players
Chattanooga Lookouts managers
Georgia Southwestern State Hurricanes baseball coaches
Hawaii Islanders players
Major League Baseball pitchers
Major League Baseball players from Panama
North Carolina Tar Heels baseball players
Rocky Mount Senators players
United States Marines
UNC Wilmington Seahawks baseball players
Washington Senators (1961–1971) players
Western Carolina Catamounts baseball coaches
York White Roses players